Edwuin Steven Cetré Angulo (born 1 January 1998), is a Colombian footballer who currently plays as a midfielder for Atlético Junior.

Club career
Cetré joined Uruguayan Segunda División side Rocha F.C. in early 2016. However, by early 2017, he was playing for Santos Laguna affiliate Santos Laguna Premier in the Segunda División de México. On May 10, 2018 Cetré made his play off debut with Santos Laguna and quickly scored his first goal during the second half of the first leg semifinal against Club America.

After the Clausura 2018 championship, Cetré was warned by Santos Laguna, on numerous occasions, about his indiscipline and nightlife; however, the midfielder ignored it. After his 21st birthday, on January 1, the player and his agent requested a contract extension. Due to his indiscipline, the club refused to offer him a new contract. The club then offered Cetré to go on loan at Tampico Madero, but he rejected the offer. Cetré started the preseason for the Clausura 2019 with the club, but was not registered to the squad. The player then left the club on 28 January 2019 and it was rumored, that he was looking for an Argentine club to play for. However, he ended up joining Atlético Junior.

International career
Cetré was first called up for the Colombian under-17 side for the Copa México de Naciones in 2014. He also played at the 2015 South American Under-17 Football Championship, scoring the only goal in the final against Brazil.

Career statistics

Club

Notes

Honours

Club
Santos Laguna
Liga MX: Clausura 2018

References

External links

1998 births
Living people
Colombian footballers
Colombian expatriate footballers
Association football midfielders
Rocha F.C. players
Santos Laguna footballers
Atlético Junior footballers
Uruguayan Segunda División players
Liga MX players
Categoría Primera A players
Colombian expatriate sportspeople in Uruguay
Colombian expatriate sportspeople in Mexico
Expatriate footballers in Uruguay
Expatriate footballers in Mexico
Sportspeople from Valle del Cauca Department